Axe ties are railway ties (or sleeper) that are hewn by hand, usually with a broadaxe. There are 2,900 ties per mile of track on a first class railroad. The early railways would not accept ties cut with a saw, as it was claimed that the kerf of the saw splintered the fibres of the wood, leaving them more likely to soak up moisture causing premature rot.

The process
Geoff Marples wrote an account of being a tiehack in the East Kootenays in 1938 and described the process of making axe ties to include: First a suitable tree was chosen and then felling and limbing the tree. Next came skidding each group of ties to a landing with a team of horses, and then loading and hauling the ties to a railway siding by truck and unloading by hand. Scaling was the key event where a railroad inspector accepted or culled (rejected) and graded each tie as a number one ( used for the main railroad lines) or number two ( used for sidings). Loading the  ties by hand onto a car was the last task. Marples wrote that he netted 48¢ for each grade one, and 36¢ for each grade two and made $150 for a winter's work.

Wood species
Cedar was the most sought after wood for ties, since it is known for being extremely resistant to rot. However, as electric power came into more common use in the early 1900s, it was substituted with other species such as Tamarack. In northern regions where jack pine was plentiful, that species became a more common source for railway ties. Jack pine ties did not last as long as cedar or tamarack (lying on the ground), but were cheaper to produce. As creosote treatment came into use the axe ties were phased out, but jack pine remained best suited for softwood ties.

Production in Canada
Axe tie production was an early industry of importance for many communities in Ontario along the railway in the early 1900s. Examples include Foleyet and Nemegos.

References

Permanent way
Wood products